The following roads are named North–South Expressway:
North–South Expressway (Malaysia)
North–South Expressway Central Link
North–South Expressway (Singapore)
North–South Expressway (Vietnam)